The 1200 class were a class of diesel locomotive built by English Electric, Bradford for Queensland Railways in 1953–1954.

History
The 1200 class were rostered to haul The Sunlander between Brisbane and Cairns, The Westlander between Brisbane and Roma and The Inlander from Townsville to Mount Isa.

A characteristic addition to the 1200s in 1961 was a sun visor to help reduce glare. As they became due for heavy overhauls in the late 1970s, they were withdrawn.

1200 has been preserved by the Australian Railway Historical Society, and is currently stored at Redbank Railway Workshops.

1225 class
In 1984, 1208 was rebuilt using parts from 1250 class locomotives 1252 and 1253, including a more powerful  engine to replace the original  EE 12SVT engine, while the body was modified to resemble a 1250 class. It earned the nickname "Hybrid" after this work and was renumbered 1225. It also resembles the Brazilian RFN Class 700. It remained in service until 1987, based at Toowoomba working mainly on the Southern line. The loco is now privately owned and is currently stored at Queensland Pioneer Steam Railway (QPSR) at Swanbank Queensland since it was moved there in mid-2010. QPSR now want it out of their premises so now its future is uncertain.

Status table

References

Co-Co locomotives
Diesel locomotives of Queensland
English Electric locomotives
Queensland Rail locomotives
Railway locomotives introduced in 1953
Diesel-electric locomotives of Australia
3 ft 6 in gauge locomotives of Australia
Streamlined diesel locomotives